City Hall station is a CTrain light rail station in Calgary, Alberta. It is located on the 7 Avenue transit mall between Macleod Trail and 3 Street S.E. It is the easternmost station downtown, and serves as a Gateway station. It was the first downtown station to have dual-side platforms (Downtown West–Kerby station, opened in 2012, was the second). It serves both the Red Line and the Blue Line and is the eastern extent of the free-fare zone.

This new dual-platform station replaces the previous City Hall and Olympic Plaza stations both of which opened May 25, 1981, as part of Calgary's first LRT line from 8 Street W to Anderson.

The original City Hall Station served only eastbound trains. The station was originally called 2 Street E. In late 1987, the station was renamed City Hall as 2 Street SE became Macleod Trail Northbound and the city did not want to call the Station Macleod Trail since it would not give a good indicator of the station's location because Macleod Trail is a long roadway traveling all the way to the very south end of the city. City Hall was chosen as the station is adjacent to the Calgary Municipal Building.

The original Olympic Plaza Station was initially called 1 Street E. It was renamed Olympic Plaza in late 1987 as its namesake is right across the street. The station was located between Macleod Trail and 1 Street SE.

On May 3, 2010, the original City Hall station was closed to be demolished and rebuilt on the spot, with a new westbound platform being constructed across the street, while the original Olympic Plaza station remained open. On June 6, 2011, both City Hall platforms opened and Olympic Plaza was permanently closed and demolished shortly thereafter. After the 2011 Stampede finished, the eastbound platform (South side of 7 Avenue; adjacent to Municipal Building) was re-closed to finish construction and officially re-opened on September 19, 2011. The Westbound platform (North side of 7 Avenue; adjacent to the Library) was completely finished as of June 6, 2011, and remained open.

Olympic Plaza was the last of the vintage 1981 Stations on 7 Avenue to be demolished. Both of the new platforms are built to 4-car length and use the same design as all other downtown stations.

Notable Locations near the station include the Calgary Municipal Building, Calgary City Hall, Arts Commons, Calgary Central Library, Bow Valley College and Olympic Plaza. Also, the United States Consulate Office is located at nearby Rocky Mountain Plaza across from Olympic Plaza (and also beside where the now-demolished station of the same name used to stand).

The station registered an average of 9,700 and 11,800 weekday boardings in 2005 (for City Hall and Olympic Plaza respectively).

References

CTrain stations
Railway stations in Canada opened in 1981
1981 establishments in Alberta